Crowan and Wendron was an electoral division of Cornwall in the United Kingdom which returned one member to sit on Cornwall Council between 2013 and 2021. It was abolished at the 2021 local elections, being succeeded by Crowan, Sithney and Wendron.

Councillors

Extent
The division represented the villages of Townshend, Praze-an-Beeble, Crowan, Burras, Trewennack, Trevenen Bal, Wendron, Trenear, Rame, Carnkie, Halwin, Porkellis, Penmarth, Polmarth and most of Leedstown (which was shared with the Gwinear-Gwithian and St Erth division). It covered 7,032 hectares in total.

Election results

2017 election

2013 election

References

Electoral divisions of Cornwall Council